The Intelligence Services Act 1994 (c. 13) is an Act of the Parliament of the United Kingdom.

The Act, sometimes abbreviated as ISA, is introduced by the long title which states:

An Act to make provision about the Secret Intelligence Service and the Government Communications Headquarters, including provision for the issue of warrants and authorisations enabling certain actions to be taken and for the issue of such warrants and authorisations to be kept under review; to make further provision about warrants issued on applications by the Security Service; to establish a procedure for the investigation of complaints about the Secret Intelligence Service and the Government Communications Headquarters; to make provision for the establishment of an Intelligence and Security Committee to scrutinise all three of those bodies; and for connected purposes.

The Act placed SIS and GCHQ on a statutory footing for the first time. The role of SIS was defined as: "to obtain and provide information relating to the actions or intentions of persons outside the British Islands; and to perform other tasks relating to the actions or intentions of such persons". The Act provided for a tribunal to investigate complaints and an oversight committee (the Intelligence and Security Committee of Parliament) composed of nine MPs reporting to the Prime Minister.

The Act also gives the Secretary of State for Foreign and Commonwealth Affairs the power to grant immunity from British prosecution to SIS personnel when they engage in any acts while on operations abroad that would be illegal under British law, such as murder.

Purpose
Section 1 of the act provides authority for the Secret Intelligence Service (MI6) to conduct intelligence activities, while Section 3 provides the similar basis for the Government Communications Headquarters (GCHQ):

in the interests of national security, with particular reference to the defence and foreign policies of Her Majesty's government in the United Kingdom; or in the interests of the economic wellbeing of the UK; or in the support of the prevention or detection of serious crime

The phrase "interests of the economic wellbeing of the UK" has been criticised by European governments as appearing to authorise industrial espionage.

Regulation
The activities of the intelligence agencies of the United Kingdom are regulated by the Regulation of Investigatory Powers Act 2000 (RIPA) which incorporates by reference the Human Rights Act 1998.

Use

Disclosed by Edward Snowden in 2013: Acting under the authority granted by the act British intelligence agencies have monitored foreign leaders and diplomats at international conferences such as meetings of the G20. The information gathered has been used to brief senior British participants during the conferences.

Disclosed by Edward Snowden in 2013: Under warrants which authorise intercepting internet traffic by tapping into fibre optic cables the Tempora program gathers all traffic flowing through the cables at the intercept point and then, using search algorithms which select material which conforms to the purposes authorised by the warrants, logs promising results for further examination. In addition to "interests of the economic wellbeing of the UK", the purposes include "intelligence on the political intentions of foreign governments; military postures of foreign countries; terrorism, international drug trafficking and fraud."

See also
 Security Service Act 1989, which covers the functions of MI5.

References

External links
 
 The Intelligence Services Act from the office of the Intelligence Services Commissioner

United Kingdom Acts of Parliament 1994
British intelligence agencies